B. Davison Secondary School (formerly known as Thames Secondary School) is a high school in London, Ontario, Canada. It was established in 2014 after amalgamating the former Sir George Ross and Thames Secondary Schools. The school is named after Basil Davison, a former staff member of both now-defunct schools.

It is dedicated to teaching students specifically about the benefits of the workforce.  B. Davison provides students with a unique emphasis on Experiential Learning Opportunities that helps students enter the workforce immediately after graduation.

See also
List of high schools in Ontario

References

External links 
 Website: http://bdavison.tvdsb.ca/en/index.aspx

High schools in London, Ontario
Educational institutions in Canada with year of establishment missing